Davinder Singh (born 23 September 1995) is an Indian professional footballer who plays as a defender for I-League club Real Kashmir and the India national team.

Career
Born in Patiala, Punjab. Singh began his career at the Dalbir Football Academy. In 2013, Singh joined the Punjabi University football team. Singh was also part of the academy of Minerva Punjab and was selected by the side to participate in the I-League 2nd Division, however, Singh got injured before the league began.

Mumbai City
On 17 August 2017, Singh was signed by Mumbai City of the Indian Super League. He made his professional debut for the club on 3 December 2017 in a league match against the Kerala Blasters. Singh started and played the whole match as Mumbai City drew the match 1–1 and won Emerging player of the match award.

International
Singh was selected by India under-23 head coach Stephen Constantine in July 2017 for the 2018 AFC U-23 Championship qualifiers. He was eventually selected and played three matches during the qualifiers. The next month, Constantine called Singh up for the India senior side.

Career statistics

Club

International

Honours

India
 SAFF Championship runner-up: 2018

References

External links 
 Davinder Singh Profile.

1995 births
Living people
Sportspeople from Patiala
Indian footballers
Mumbai City FC players
Association football fullbacks
Footballers from Punjab, India
Indian Super League players
India youth international footballers
Chennaiyin FC players
Real Kashmir FC players